Varzaneh County is in Isfahan province, Iran. The capital of the county is the city of Varzaneh. At the 2006 census, the region's population (as Bon Rud District of Isfahan County) was 26,285 in 6,934 households. The following census in 2011 counted 27,687 people in 8,137 households. At the 2016 census, the district's population was 29,718 in 9,225 households. The district was separated from Isfahan County in 2021 to become Varzaneh County.

Administrative divisions

The population history of Varzaneh County's administrative divisions (as Bon Rud District of Isfahan County) over three consecutive censuses is shown in the following table.

References

Counties of Isfahan Province

fa:شهرستان ورزنه